Marcia is an oil on wood painting by Domenico Beccafumi, with the dimensions of 92,1 by 53,3 cm, executed c. 1519, showing Marcia, wife of Cato the Younger. It and Tanaquil, both in the National Gallery, in London, originally formed part of a series of paintings of noted women from Roman antiquity.

References

1519 paintings
Paintings by Domenico Beccafumi
Collections of the National Gallery, London